Eisenbarth is a surname. Notable people with the surname include: 

François Eisenbarth (1928–1987), Luxembourgian gymnast
George Eisenbarth (1947–2012), American diabetologist
Johann Andreas Eisenbarth (1663–1727), German surgeon